Primorye Ussuriysk is an ice hockey team in Ussuriysk, Russia. The club plays in the Pervaya Liga, the third level of Russian ice hockey.

Ice hockey teams in Russia